The Barley Mow is a grade II listed pub located at 8 Dorset Street, Marylebone, London, W1. 

It is on the Campaign for Real Ale's National Inventory of Historic Pub Interiors. Public houses on this list have remained relatively unchanged since World War II or at least for the past thirty years. It was built in 1791 and is rumored to be the longest standing building in Marylebone. It is also one of the last remaining free houses in central London. The Barley Mow is a pub with listed wooden booth seating, occasional live music and Saturday quizzes.

References

External links 

National Inventory Pubs
Commercial buildings completed in 1791
Grade II listed pubs in the City of Westminster
Buildings and structures in Marylebone